Tiger lily or Tiger Lily may refer to:

Plants
 Lilium, a genus of plants in the family Liliaceae, principally:
 Lilium lancifolium, a lily native to northern Asia and to Japan
 but also:
 Lilium bulbiferum, a lily native to Europe
 Lilium catesbaei, a lily species native to south-eastern North America
 Lilium columbianum, a lily native to western North America
 Lilium henryi, an orange lily native to central China
 Lilium superbum, a lily native to eastern and central North America
 Daylilies, plants of the genus Hemerocallis, often called "golden needles", widely used in Asian cooking
 Hemerocallis fulva, a daylily species native to Asia, and widely naturalized in North America

People
 Pseudonym of Lillie Devereux Blake
 Heavenly Hiraani Tiger Lily Hutchence Geldof (born 1996), daughter of Michael Hutchence, Paula Yates, and adoptive daughter of Bob Geldof.
 Tigerlily (DJ) (born 1992), Australian DJ
 Tigerlily Taylor, British model

Fiction
 Tiger Lily (Peter Pan), a Native American princess character from Peter Pan
 Tiger Lily, a character from the Rupert Bear comics
 The tiger-lily, one of the "live flowers" in Through the Looking-Glass and What Alice Found There by Lewis Carroll
 Tiger Lily White, stage name of a fictional burlesque dancer portrayed by Lucille Ball in the film Dance, Girl, Dance
 Dr. Berenice "Tigerlily" Jones, a minor character in the webcomic Skin Horse by Jeffrey Wells and Shaenon Garrity
 Tigerlily Sakai, a fictional character from the Stitch! anime

Music
 Tigerlily, 1995 album by Natalie Merchant
 Tigerlily (Lillix album), 2010
 The Tiger Lillies, 1989 London band
 Tiger Lilies, an 1867 novel written by Sidney Lanier
 Tiger Lily, a 1980s band founded by Laura Molina
 Tiger Lily (UK band), a short-lived 1970s glam-rock band
 "Tiger Lily", song by Luna from the 1994 album Bewitched
 "Tigerlily", song by Bertine Zetlitz from the 2000 album Beautiful So Far
 "Tiger Lily", song by The Bluetones from the 2000 album Science & Nature
 "Tiger Lily", song by Matchbook Romance from the 2003 album Stories and Alibis
 "Tigerlily", song by La Roux from the 2009 album La Roux

Places
 Tiger Lily, Alberta, unincorporated community in the County of Barrhead No. 11
 Tiger Lily, California, community in El Dorado County

Other
 The Tiger Lily, a 1919 silent film drama
 17768 Tigerlily, asteroid
 Tigerlily Swimwear, label established by Jodhi Meares, later acquired by Billabong
 Tigerlily (given name), the personal name.

See also
 Leopard lily (disambiguation)